Glaciology first emerged as a science in the Swiss Alps, where most of the first glaciologist lived. Since then glaciologist of several countries, particularly from the First World, have made notable contributions to the discipline. Many glaciologists have background studies in geology, physics and climatology.

References

 *